Ionuț Popa (17 April 1953 – 25 June 2020) was a Romanian professional footballer and manager. Popa managed teams such as UTA Arad, Bihor Oradea, Politehnica Iași and ACS Poli Timișoara, among others.

Managerial career
Popa was the coach of Liga I team Politehnica Iași from 2004, when they were promoted to the top league, until January 2009, becoming one of the longest serving coaches in Liga I. He quit his job due to a lack of funds. He was soon replaced by Cristiano Bergodi.

Honours
UTA Arad
Divizia B: 2001–02

Politehnica Iași (2010)
Divizia B: 2011–12

References

External links
 

1953 births
2020 deaths
Romanian footballers
CS Unirea Sânnicolau Mare players
Romanian football managers
FC UTA Arad managers
FC Bihor Oradea managers
CSM Jiul Petroșani managers
FC Politehnica Iași (2010) managers
CS Mioveni managers
ACS Poli Timișoara managers
People from Arad County
Association footballers not categorized by position